This article lists the presidents of the Assembly of Serbia and Montenegro.

List

See also
Parliament of Serbia and Montenegro
President of the National Assembly of Serbia
President of the Parliament of Montenegro

Sources
Yugoslav ministries, etc – Rulers.org

Assembly, Presidents
Serbia and Montenegro, Assembly